Songyuan Road is a station on Line 10 of the Shanghai Metro. It began operation on April 10, 2010.

References

Railway stations in Shanghai
Shanghai Metro stations in Changning District
Railway stations in China opened in 2010
Line 10, Shanghai Metro